Cable & Wireless Worldwide PLC  (informally Cable & Wireless) was a British multinational telecommunications services company headquartered in Bracknell, United Kingdom. It was formed in 2010 by the split of Cable & Wireless plc into two companies, the other being Cable & Wireless Communications serving Central America and the Caribbean.

Cable & Wireless Worldwide specialised in servicing large corporates, governments, carriers and resellers and its services included managed voice, data and IP based services. It had operations in Asia Pacific, Europe, India, the Middle East & Africa and North America. The company was bought by Vodafone in July 2012 and integrated into the business on 1 April 2013.

History
The company was formed on 26 March 2010, made up of the remaining business of Cable & Wireless plc following the demerger of the company's international division to form Cable & Wireless Communications. The split meant that the FTSE 100 Index temporarily held 101 firms, before Cable & Wireless Communications dropped to the FTSE 250 Index.

Following the split, CWW went through a tumultuous period – its shares, which hit a high of 98.5 pence after the split, valuing the group at $4.25 billion; fell to 13 pence in November 2011, increasing speculation it would be a takeover target.

On 28 June 2011, the board of Cable & Wireless Worldwide accepted the resignation of Jim Marsh and announced that John Pluthero, the then-Chairman, would become Chief Executive. On 14 November 2011, Cable & Wireless Worldwide announced that it had appointed the former Vodafone Group executive Gavin Darby as its new chief executive.

On 23 April 2012, Vodafone announced an agreement to acquire Cable & Wireless Worldwide for £1.04 billion.

Vodafone, who was looking to strengthen its integrated corporate services business arm - Vodafone Global Enterprise, bid for CWW with Tata Communications Ltd. also in the fray. Vodafone became the sole bidder after Tata group withdrew; and on 23 April 2012, Vodafone announced an agreement to acquire the operations of CWW for £1.04 billion in cash. On 18 June 2012, CWW shareholders voted in favour of the Vodafone offer, exceeding the 75% of shares necessary for the deal to go ahead. Vodafone was advised by UBS AG, while Barclays and Rothschild advised Cable & Wireless.

The acquisition gave Vodafone access to CWW's fibre network for businesses, enabling it to take unified communications solutions to large enterprises in UK and globally; and expand its enterprise integration service offerings in emerging markets.

The purchase was completed on 30 July 2012, and one-time CWW employee and CEO of Vodafone Global Enterprise Nick Jefferey was appointed as CEO of CWW. Cable & Wireless was fully integrated into Vodafone on 1 April 2013.

Operations
Cable & Wireless Worldwide was the third-largest supplier of IP services to FTSE 350 Index customers. However, with recent cable company consolidation it can no longer claim its position as the second largest UK fixed player. The fortunes of the international wholesale telecoms division of C&W UK is significant - accounting for over one third of UK revenues. Indeed, its international wholesale voice operation and IP network (AS1273) remain sizable, but commercially struggling.

Following the acquisition of Energis in August 2005, C&W strengthened its UK position but still have only half the Internet Access corporate market share of former incumbent (BT). Former CEO Francesco Caio publicly stated the aim of making C&W the preferred alternative to BT in the UK. John Pluthero, on his accession in the Energis management takeover, modified this to be the leading UK IP services company.

C&W also bought Bulldog Communications in the UK, providing it with an LLU network as well as a consumer broadband Internet service provider. During aggressive expansion it gained a poor reputation for provisioning and customer service. Falling new sales and a strategy change led C&W to sell the brand and customer base to Pipex in September 2006. It continues to own, and wholesale on, the LLU capability. In 2009 through a series of mergers and takeovers Pipex became part of TalkTalk.

Cable & Wireless HKT was the Hong Kong operations of British-based telecom firm Cable & Wireless and was established in the then British colony in 1934. It was not until 1981 that the unit formally registered as a Hong Kong company, Cable and Wireless (Hong Kong) Limited. In 1987 Cable and Wireless (Hong Kong) Limited merged with Hong Kong Telephone Company as Hong Kong Telecom. It was renamed as Cable and Wireless HKT International in 1998. CWHKT was acquired by PCCW in 2000.

Executive remuneration
Shareholder groups repeatedly warned about excessive executive remuneration at the company. Before it split into two separately listed companies in early 2010, Cable & Wireless suffered one of the biggest shareholder rebellions in 2009 when 38% of the shareholder register failed to back the company's pay policy at a fiery meeting. The company's highly controversial long-term incentive plan (LTIP) was calculated on 10% of the company valuation and was claimed to pay out to senior managers; in fact the members of the LTIP were the only executive directors who for the year 2009/2010 shared a £60 million bonus pool.

See also

All Red Line
Imperial Wireless Chain

References

External links
 

Defunct telecommunications companies of the United Kingdom
Telegraph companies
Vodafone
Companies based in Bracknell
Defunct companies of England
British companies established in 2010
Telecommunications companies established in 2010
Telecommunications companies disestablished in 2013
2010 establishments in England
2013 disestablishments in England
Companies formerly listed on the Hong Kong Stock Exchange
Companies formerly listed on the London Stock Exchange
Companies formerly listed on the Tokyo Stock Exchange
British companies disestablished in 2013